Adnane Tighadouini (Berber: ⵄⴰⴷⵏⴰⵏ ⵜⵉⴴⴰⴷⵡⵉⵏⵉ, ; born 30 October 1992) is a professional footballer who plays as a left winger. A free agent, he most recently played for Maghreb de Fès. Born in the Netherlands, he represents Morocco at international level.

Club career

Vitesse
Born in Ede, Tighadouini joined Vitesse Arnhem's youth setup in 2003, after appearing for VV Ede and VV Blauw Geel '55. He made his professional – and Eredivisie – debut on 24 April 2011, coming on as a second-half substitute for Davy Pröpper in a 4–2 away loss against FC Utrecht, in which he also scored the last goal.

Tighadouini played his second match in a 2–1 defeat at PSV Eindhoven on 1 May 2011. On 10 January of the following year, after appearing only once during the whole campaign, he was loaned to FC Volendam until June.

On 27 August 2012, Tighadouini moved to SC Cambuur, in a season-long loan deal. On 30 November he scored a brace in a 3–2 home win against SC Telstar.

NAC Breda
On 3 January 2014, after receiving no playing time, Tighadouini signed a 3.5-year contract with NAC Breda. He made his debut for the club on the 18th, replacing Anouar Hadouir in a 3–0 away loss against AZ Alkmaar.

Tighadouini was an undisputed starter for NAC during the 2014–15 campaign, scoring 14 goals in 33 matches. Highlights included braces against former clubs Vitesse and Cambuur, FC Dordrecht and FC Groningen.

Málaga
On 10 July 2015, it was announced that Tighadouini had signed a five-year deal with Spanish La Liga side Málaga CF. He made his debut on 13 September, replacing compatriot Nordin Amrabat for the final seven minutes of a goalless draw against SD Eibar at the Estadio La Rosaleda. On 24 October, he scored his first goal for the Andalusians, opening their 2–0 home win over Deportivo de La Coruña.

After just 12 competitive appearances in the first half of the season, Tighadouini was loaned to Kayserispor for its second half.

Vitesse (loan)
On 30 August 2016, Tighadouini re-joined Vitesse on a season-long loan. On 11 September 2016, he made his Vitesse return in a 1–0 away defeat against Ajax, replacing Chelsea loanee Nathan in the 64th minute. On 22 September 2016, he went on to score a brace in a 7–2 victory over Derde Divisie side ASV De Dijk in the KNVB Cup, scoring both goals in the space of four minutes.

Tighadouini went on to win the 2017 Dutch Cup for Vitesse. He replaced Nathan Allan de Souza after 73 minutes of the final. Due to this result, the club won the KNVB Cup for the first time in its 125-year history.

Twente (loan)
On 23 August 2017, Tighadouini joined FC Twente on loan for the entire season.

International career
Tighadouini played for the Morocco under-23 team in the 2011 CAF U-23 Championship. He scored his first goal in the category on 29 November, netting the game's only against Algeria.

He debuted for the senior Morocco national team in a World Cup qualifying 1–0 loss against Equatorial Guinea on 15 November 2015, being taken off after 38 minutes for Omar El Kaddouri at the Estadio de Bata.

Career statistics

Honours

Club
Vitesse
 KNVB Cup: 2016–17

References

External links
Voetbal International profile 

1992 births
Living people
People from Ede, Netherlands
Moroccan footballers
Morocco international footballers
Dutch sportspeople of Moroccan descent
Dutch footballers
Association football wingers
Eredivisie players
Eerste Divisie players
SBV Vitesse players
FC Volendam players
SC Cambuur players
NAC Breda players
FC Twente players
La Liga players
Málaga CF players
Esbjerg fB players
Danish Superliga players
Süper Lig players
Kayserispor footballers
Al Kharaitiyat SC players
Qatari Second Division players
Morocco under-20 international footballers
2011 CAF U-23 Championship players
Dutch expatriate footballers
Moroccan expatriate footballers
Dutch expatriate sportspeople in Spain
Moroccan expatriate sportspeople in Spain
Expatriate footballers in Spain
Dutch expatriate sportspeople in Turkey
Moroccan expatriate sportspeople in Turkey
Expatriate footballers in Turkey
Expatriate footballers in Qatar
Dutch expatriate sportspeople in Qatar
Moroccan expatriate sportspeople in Qatar
Moroccan expatriate sportspeople in Denmark
Dutch expatriate sportspeople in Denmark
Expatriate men's footballers in Denmark
Maghreb de Fès players
Footballers from Gelderland